Predrag Filipović (Serbian Cyrillic: Предраг Филиповић; born 5 October 1978) is a Serbian racewalker. He competed for Serbia and Montenegro at the 2004 Summer Olympics and finished 39th in the 20 kilometre walk with a time of 1:31:35. He represented Serbia at the 2008, 2012 and 2016 Olympics, and placed 41st and 48th in the 20 km walk in 2008 and 2012, respectively. In 2016, he finished 50th in the 50 km walk. His twin brother Nenad competed alongside at the 2008, 2012 and 2016 Olympics.

Achievements

See also
 Serbian records in athletics

References

External links
 
 
 
 
  (archive)

1978 births
Living people
Serbian male racewalkers
Olympic athletes of Serbia
Athletes (track and field) at the 2004 Summer Olympics
Athletes (track and field) at the 2008 Summer Olympics
Athletes (track and field) at the 2012 Summer Olympics
Athletes (track and field) at the 2016 Summer Olympics
Olympic athletes of Serbia and Montenegro
Sportspeople from Leskovac